Paul Engelen (born 30 October 1949)  is a British make-up artist. He has over 75 credits in TV and films, including the TV show Game of Thrones, for which he has won a number of Emmy Awards.

Oscar nominations
Both nominations were in Best Makeup.

1984 Academy Awards- nominated for the film Greystoke: The Legend of Tarzan, Lord of the Apes. Nomination was shared with Rick Baker. Lost to Amadeus.  
1994 Academy Awards- nominated for Mary Shelley's Frankenstein, nomination shared with Carol Hemming and Daniel Parker. Lost to Ed Wood.

Selected filmography
The Man With The Golden Gun (1974)
The Spy Who Loved Me (1977)
Escape to Athena (1979)
Reds (1981)
Pink Floyd - The Wall (1982)
Greystoke: The Legend of Tarzan, Lord of the Apes (1984)
Little Shop of Horrors (1986)
Empire of the Sun (1987)
Batman (1989)
Robin Hood: Prince of Thieves (1991)
The Three Musketeers (1993)
Mary Shelley's Frankenstein (1994)
The Ghost and the Darkness (1996)
Seven Years in Tibet (1997)
The Saint (1997)
Star Wars: Episode I – The Phantom Menace (1999)
A Midsummer Night's Dream (1999)
Gladiator (2000)
Lara Croft: Tomb Raider (2001)
The Hours (2002)
Die Another Day (2002)
Cold Mountain (2003)
Troy (2004)
Munich (2005)
Kingdom of Heaven (2005)
Casino Royale (2006)
Quantum of Solace (2008)
The Chronicles of Narnia: Prince Caspian (2008)
Robin Hood (2010)
Wrath of the Titans (2012)
Hercules (2014)

References

External links

 interview British Entertainment History Project

British make-up artists
Living people
1949 births
People from Surrey
Best Makeup BAFTA Award winners
Emmy Award winners